Edward Thompson Wailes (February 16, 1903 – June 25, 1969) was an American diplomat and lawyer who served as an ambassador to Czechoslovakia, South Africa, Iran, and Hungary. He also served as the sixth Assistant Secretary of State for Administration.

Early life and education

Edward T. Wailes was born in Brooklyn, New York City on February 16, 1903. He earned a Bachelor of Arts degree from Princeton University in 1925 and a Bachelor of Laws from Columbia Law School in 1927.

Career 
After graduating from law school, Wailes joined the United States Foreign Service. As a Foreign Service Officer, he alternated between field appointments and desk jobs at the United States Department of State in Washington, D.C. Overseas, he was posted in Nanking 1930-33; in Brussels 1936-39; in Ottawa 1942; and in London 1943-45. He married Cornelia Lyon on December 30, 1933.

In 1945, he served as Special Assistant to the Director of the State Department's Office of European Affairs, and then as chief of the Division of British Commonwealth Affairs 1945-48. He became a Foreign Service Inspector in 1948, and Chief Inspector of the Foreign Service Inspection Corps in 1951.

In 1953, President of the United States Harry Truman nominated Wailes as Assistant Secretary of State for Administration and, after Senate confirmation, he held this post from May 29, 1953 until June 22, 1954.

President Dwight Eisenhower named Wailes United States Ambassador to South Africa on September 15, 1954, with Ambassador Wailes presenting his credentials on November 29, 1954 and holding that post until August 11, 1956.

Eisenhower then named Wailes United States Ambassador to Hungary, with Ambassador Wailes receiving his commission on July 26, 1956. At the time of this appointment, the People's Republic of Hungary was ruled by the Hungarian Communist Party, under Prime Minister of Hungary András Hegedüs. The Hungarian Revolution of 1956 began on October 23, 1956, with crowds demanding the return of former Prime Minister Imre Nagy, who had pledged to lead Hungary out of the Warsaw Pact and promised democratic reforms. The next day, Nagy took over as Prime Minister. On the advice of Soviet Ambassador to Hungary Yuri Andropov, Hegedüs fled to the Soviet Union and signed papers asking for Soviet intervention in Hungary to stop Nagy. Wailes arrived in Hungary on November 2, 1956. Soviet tanks entered Budapest on November 4, Nagy fled, and the pro-Soviet János Kádár became Prime Minister of Hungary. The Hungarian Revolution ended on November 10, with the Soviets having succeeded in blocking any movement towards democratic reforms in Hungary. Wailes refused to present his credentials to the new government, stating that the government "did not represent the people." Shortly thereafter he was "recalled for consultations" and left Hungary on February 27, 1957.

Wailes spent 1957-58 as Deputy Commandant of the National War College. President Eisenhower then named him United States Ambassador to Iran and he served in that post 1958 to 1961. President John F. Kennedy then nominated him as United States Ambassador to Czechoslovakia, with Wailes presenting his credentials on July 28, 1961 and serving as ambassador until October 22, 1962.

Death 
Wailes retired in 1962 and died in 1969.

References

Political Graveyard Bio

1903 births
1969 deaths
United States Assistant Secretaries of State
People from Brooklyn
Princeton University alumni
Columbia Law School alumni
Ambassadors of the United States to South Africa
Ambassadors of the United States to Hungary
Ambassadors of the United States to Iran
Ambassadors of the United States to Czechoslovakia
United States Foreign Service personnel
20th-century American diplomats